Truro Redannick is an electoral division of Cornwall in the United Kingdom and returns one member to sit on Cornwall Council. The current Councillor is Rob Nolan, a Liberal Democrat and the council's Portfolio Holder for the Environment and Public Protection.

Extent
Truro Redannick covers the west and north west of the city of Truro, including the suburbs of Newham and parts of Highertown (which is shared with the Truro Trehaverne division). The division covers 301 hectares in total.

Election results

2017 election

2013 election

References

Electoral divisions of Cornwall Council
Politics of Truro